Kutless is an American Christian rock band from Portland, Oregon formed in 1999. Since their formation, they have released multiple studio albums and one live album, Live from Portland. They have sold over 3 million records worldwide.

History

Earlier years (1999–2000) 
The band was formed in Portland, Oregon, as a campus worship band named "Call Box". They performed during the 1999–2000 school year at Warner Pacific College. Their first guitarist, Andrew Morrison, decided to leave the band shortly before they signed with BEC records. James Mead replaced Andrew at lead guitar. The Band changed their name to "Kutless" in October 2001, before releasing their first three-track EP followed up by their full-length album in 2002 on BEC Recordings. Kutless chose their name because of a Bible verse. Romans 6:23 says, "For the wages of sin is death, but the free gift of God is eternal life in Christ Jesus our Lord" (NRSV). Because of this, the band says, "He took our cuts for us... leaving us 'Kutless'."

Early releases (2002–2007) 
Kutless' first two singles from their self-titled debut album were "Your Touch" and "Run". The latter would hold the record for the longest-charting song in the history of the R&R Top 40 charts.

Kutless had their touring debut between February and April 2003 when they opened up for Audio Adrenaline and MercyMe.

In 2004, Kutless released their second full-length album Sea of Faces. The album peaked at No. 97 on the Billboard 200 chart. After selling over 250,000 copies, Kutless went on their first headlining tour, X 2004. That year, Kutless was scheduled to perform at the 2004 Summer Olympics in Greece but could not make it because the airline canceled their flight.

In 2005, Kutless played a Katrina Benefit Relief Concert in Portland, Oregon. They also released their first worship album, Strong Tower that peaked at No. 87 on the Billboard 200 albums chart. After recording but before release of Strong Tower, bassist Kyle Zeigler and drummer Kyle Mitchell left the band to form Verbatim Records, a nationally distributed record label based in the Portland, Oregon area. They were replaced with bassist Dave Luetkenhoelter and drummer Jeffrey Gilbert, who both came from the recently broken-up Christian rock band Seven Places. Kutless also went on the Strong Tower tour that year.

The fourth album, Hearts of the Innocent, was released on March 21, 2006, peaking at No. 45 on the Billboard 200 Albums chart. The band followed up with a tour, also featuring Stellar Kart, Disciple, and Falling Up.

The March 28, 2006 episode of NBC's Scrubs, "My Bright Idea", incorporated a significant portion of the song "All the Words" from Sea of Faces during the final scene. The episode hit eleven-week ratings high and was among the first Scrubs episodes that could be downloaded on iTunes. Laura Hutfless from the William Morris Agency said, "Placing the Kutless song, 'All the Words', on Scrubs was truly a team effort. We at William Morris were all very pleased with the way the song was incorporated into the television show and are thrilled that millions of Americans have now been exposed to this incredible band. I'm confident that this is only the beginning for Kutless as they continue to give their audience captivating and inspirational music and win new fans every day." Kutless's video "Shut Me Out" has been placed on an exclusive Microsoft/Wal-Mart DVD give-a-way. Consumers who purchase the new Xbox game "The Apprentice," featuring Donald Trump, will receive a copy of Kutless's new video. This is estimated to be in the hands of 350,000 gamers. Plus, Target Stores announced that the "Shut Me Out" video will play nationwide in all stores on Target TV (Red Channel) beginning in May (from Big Machine Media). Suzuki Motor Corporation announced that it will be the sole sponsor of the band's Hearts of the Innocent tour.

In May 2007, longtime Kutless guitarist Ryan Shrout decided to leave Kutless, after his daughter was diagnosed with a rare eye disease. Shrout chose to support his family during this time, and left Kutless to do so. Nick De Partee, who had been a tech for the band, took Shrout's spot. This left Jon Micah Sumrall as the only remaining original member, although James Mead had joined before the first album.

The band's songs "Hearts of the Innocent" and "Beyond the Surface" are playable songs on the Christian Guitar Hero game called Guitar Praise. Their songs "Shut Me Out" and "Your Touch" were later featured in Guitar Praises Expansion Pack 1. Their song "The Feeling" appears on the video game Rock Band 2 as an extra downloadable song. "Strong Tower" was added in 2011.

Later releases (2008–present) 
In 2008, Kutless released their fifth album To Know That You're Alive. The album peaked at No. 64 on the Billboard 200 album chart and reached No. 1 on the Billboard Christian Albums chart.

The band made a headline appearance at the "Ultimate Event" Christian concert at Alton Towers in the United Kingdom during May 2009. It was their debut UK appearance.

In 2009, the band released another worship album, It Is Well. It was co-produced by Dave Lubben. The single "What Faith Can Do" was No. 1 for two months on the Billboard Christian songs chart and was the No. 2 overall ranked Christian song on Billboards year end analysis.

They toured with Casting Crowns on the spring leg of the Until The Whole World Hears Tour, and then headlined the It Is Well Tour with Chasen and The Museum. On the fall leg of the tour, they toured with Sidewalk Prophets and Above The Golden State. The band then toured on Winter Jam 2011, alongside Newsboys, David Crowder Band, RED, KJ-52, and others.

Kutless released their seventh album Believer on February 28, 2012. It debuted at No. 36 on the Billboard 200 chart and debuted at No. 1 on the Billboard Christian Albums chart for the week of March 17, 2012. The album's first single, "Carry Me to the Cross", peaked at No. 8 on Billboards Christian Songs chart.

In 2012, drummer Jeffrey Gilbert left the band and was replaced by Kyle Peek, who had been the drummer for American Idol Season 7 winner David Cook's band.

Kutless embarked on the first leg of the Believer Tour, partnering with Compassion International later in 2012. The tour went to over 20 cities across the U.S. and included Fireflight, Rhett Walker Band, Hyland, and Justin McRoberts. In December 2012 Kutless teamed up with Nick Hall to headline Pulse's Christmas tour, The Reason.

In May 2013 Kutless posted on social media that bassist Dave Luetkenhoelter had decided to leave the band. Their former merchandise manager Neal Cameron became the new bass player of Kutless in April 2014.

Kutless released Glory, their eighth full-length album, on BEC records in February 2014.  the album has released three singles "You Alone", "Always" and "Never Too Late".

In March–May 2014 Kutless shared a co-Headlining tour with Audio Adrenaline, immediately following this tour the band made it public that drummer Kyle Peek would be leaving the band to spend more time with his family and to explore worship leading at the band's home church in Portland. A few months after, long time guitarist Nick DePartee also left the band to go in a new direction, in his family life, artistically and in music. They were replaced by Vince DiCarlo and Drew Porter on guitar and drums, respectively.

A new single, "Bring It On", was to be sent to Christian AC radio on October 6, 2015. 

In 2015, Vince DiCarlo left the band, and was replaced by Nathan Parrish on guitar.

In 2018, Drew Porter was replaced by Matt Christopherson as their new drummer.

In July 2022, to commemorate the 20th anniversary of their debut album, the band released an EP called TWENTY, featuring re-imagined songs from their self-titled album.  Afterwards, in September 30th, 2022, Kutless released a single, "Words of Fire", which showed a return to their hard rock roots. On December 2nd, 2022, the band released a second single, "End of the World", collaborating with Disciple.

Members 

Current members
 Jon Micah Sumrall – lead vocals (1999–present)
 James Mead – rhythm guitar, backing vocals (2001–present)
 Neal Cameron  – bass guitar (2013–present)
 Nathan Parrish – lead guitar (2015–present)
 Matt Christopherson – drums (2018–present)

Former members
 Andrew Morrison – lead guitar (1999–2000)
 Nathan "Stu" Stuart – bass guitar (1999–2002)
 Kyle Zeigler – bass guitar (2002–2005)
 Kyle Mitchell – drums (1999–2005)
 Ryan Shrout – lead guitar, backing vocals (2000–2007)
 Jeffrey Gilbert (formerly of Seven Places) – drums (2005–2012)
 Dave Luetkenhoelter (formerly of Seven Places) – bass guitar (2005–2013)
 Kyle Peek – drums, backing vocals (2012–2014)
 Nick DePartee – lead guitar, backing vocals (2007–2014)
 Vince DiCarlo – lead guitar, backing vocals (2014–2015)
 Drew Porter (formerly of Showbread) – drums 

Timeline

Discography 

 Kutless (2002)
 Sea of Faces (2004)
 Strong Tower (2005)
 Hearts of the Innocent (2006)
 To Know That You're Alive (2008)
 It Is Well (2009)
 Believer (2012)
 Glory (2014) 
 Surrender (2015)
 Alpha / Omega (2017)

EPs 
Twenty EP (July 20th, 2022)

This Is Christmas (October 4, 2011)

Singles

Awards

GMA Dove Awards

References

External links 
 

American Christian rock groups
Musical groups from Portland, Oregon
BEC Recordings artists
Tooth & Nail Records artists
Christian alternative metal groups
Musical groups established in 1999
1999 establishments in Oregon
Alternative rock groups from Oregon